Brookula tanseimaruae is a species of sea snail, a marine gastropod mollusk, unassigned in the superfamily Seguenzioidea.

Distribution
This species occurs in Japan.

References

tanseimaruae